Anne Bugge-Paulsen (born 29 June 1979) was a Norwegian women's international footballer who played as a defender. She was a member of the Norway women's national football team. She was part of the team at the UEFA Women's Euro 2001. On club level she played for Arna-Bjørnar in Norway.

References

External links
 
 
 

1979 births
Living people
Norwegian women's footballers
Arna-Bjørnar players
Norway women's youth international footballers
Norway women's international footballers
Place of birth missing (living people)
Women's association football defenders